In computer science, the list-labeling problem involves maintaining a totally ordered set S supporting the following operations:

 insert(X), which inserts X into set S; 
 delete(X), which removes X from set S;
 label(X), which returns a label assigned to X subject to:
 label(X) 
  X,Y  S, X < Y implies label(X) < label(Y)

The cost of a  list labeling algorithm is the number of label (re-)assignments per insertion or deletion.  List labeling algorithms have applications in many areas, including the order-maintenance problem, cache-oblivious data structures, data structure persistence,<ref
name="Driscoll">.</ref> graph algorithms<ref
name="Eppstein">.</ref> and fault-tolerant data structures.<ref
name="Aumann">.</ref>

Sometimes the list labeling problem is presented where S is not a set of values but rather a set of objects subject to a total order.  In this setting, when an item is inserted into S, it is specified to be the successor of some other item already in S.  For example, this is the way that list labeling is used in the order-maintenance problem.  The solutions presented below apply to both formulations.

Upper bounds

Suppose that no more than  items are stored in the list-labeling structure at any time. Four cases have been studied:

Exponential Labels
In the exponential label case, each item that is inserted can be given a label that is the average of its neighboring labels. It takes  insertions before two items are at adjacent labels and there are no labels available for items in between them. When this happens, all items are relabelled evenly from the space of all labels. This incurs  relabeling cost.

Polynomial Labels
The other cases of list labeling can be solved via balanced binary search trees.  Consider , a binary search tree on S of height .  We can label every node in the tree via a path label as follows:  
Let  be the sequence of left and right edges on the root-to- path, encoded as bits. If  is a leaf, we append s as the low order bits until  has  bits. If 
 is an internal node, we append one  and then s as the low order bits until  has  bits. 

If  , then because  is a search tree,  will be in the left subtree and will 

Hence .

We conclude that the  function fulfills the monotonicity property of the label() function.

Weight-balanced trees

In order to use a self-balancing binary search tree to solve the list labeling problem, we need to first define the cost function of a balancing operation on insertion or deletion to equal the number of labels that are changed, since every rebalancing operation
of the tree would have to also update all path labels in the subtree rooted at the site of the rebalance.  So, 
for example, rotating a node with a subtree of size
, which can be done in constant time under usual
circumstances, requires  path label updates. In
particular, if the node being rotated is the root then the rotation
would take time linear in the size of the whole tree. With that much
time the entire tree could be rebuilt. We will see below that there
are self-balancing binary search tree data structures that cause an
appropriate number of label updates during rebalancing.

A weight-balanced tree BB[] is defined as follows.

The height of a BB[] tree with  nodes is at most   Therefore, in order to solve the list-labeling problem, we need  to achieve a depth of 

A scapegoat tree is a weight-balanced tree where whenever a node no longer satisfies the weight-balance condition the entire subtree rooted at that node is rebuilt.  This rebalancing scheme is ideal for list labeling, since the cost of rebalancing now equals the cost of relabeling.    The amortized cost of an insertion or deletion is   For the list labeling problem, the cost becomes:

 : , the cost of list labeling is amortized  (Folklore, modification of Itai, Konheim and Rodeh.)
 : , the cost of list labeling is amortized  This bound was first achieved by Itai, Konheim, and Rodeh and deamortized by Willard.
A more careful algorithm can achieve this bound even in the case where  is not a power of two.

Lower bounds and open problems

In the case where , a lower bound of  has been established for list labeling.  This lower bound applies to randomized algorithms, and so the known bounds for this case are tight.

In the case where , there is a lower bound of  list labeling cost for deterministic algorithms.  Furthermore, the same lower bound holds for smooth algorithms, which are those whose only relabeling operation assigns labels evenly in a range of items  This lower bound is surprisingly strong in that it applies in the offline cases where all insertions and deletions are known ahead of time.  

Applications
The best known applications of list labeling are the order-maintenance problem and packed-memory arrays for cache-oblivious data structures. The order-maintenance problem is that of maintaining a data structure on a linked list to answer order queries: given two items in the linked list, which is closer to the front of the list? The time for insertions and deletions can be improved to constant time by combining exponential polynomial list labeling with exponential list labeling on small lists.

The packed-memory array is an array of size  to hold  items so that any subarray of size  holds  items. Packed-memory arrays are used in cache-oblivious data structures to store data that must be indexed and scanned. The density bounds guarantee that a scan through the data is asymptotically optimal in the external-memory model for any block transfer size.

References

Amortized data structures